Don Glantz (born July 8, 1933) was a Canadian football player who played for the Edmonton Eskimos. He won the Grey Cup with the Eskimos in 1955. Glantz was a native of Nebraska and attended the University of Nebraska. He was a draft pick of the Washington Redskins.

References

1933 births
Living people
American players of Canadian football
Edmonton Elks players
People from Central City, Nebraska
University of Nebraska alumni
Players of American football from Nebraska